English physicist and mathematician Isaac Newton produced works exploring chronology, and biblical interpretation (especially of the Apocalypse), and alchemy.  Some of this could be considered occult. Newton's scientific work may have been of lesser personal importance to him, as he placed emphasis on rediscovering the wisdom of the ancients. In this sense, some historians, including economist John Maynard Keynes, believe that any reference to a "Newtonian Worldview" as being purely mechanical in nature is somewhat inaccurate. Historical research on Newton's occult studies in relation to his science have also been used to challenge the disenchantment narrative within critical theory.

After purchasing and studying Newton's alchemical works, Keynes, for example, opined in 1942 at the tercentenary of Newton's birth that "Newton was not the first of the age of reason, he was the last of the magicians..." In the Early Modern Period of Newton's lifetime, the educated embraced a world view different from that of later centuries. Distinctions between science, superstition, and pseudoscience were still being formulated, and a devoutly Christian biblical perspective permeated Western culture.

Alchemical research
Much of what are known as Isaac Newton's occult studies can largely be attributed to his study of alchemy. From a young age, Newton was deeply interested in all forms of natural sciences and materials science, an interest which would ultimately lead to some of his better-known contributions to science. His earliest encounters with certain alchemical theories and practices were during his childhood, when a twelve year old Isaac Newton was boarding in the attic of an apothecaries shop. During Newton's lifetime, the study of chemistry was still in its infancy, so many of his experimental studies used esoteric language and vague terminology more typically associated with alchemy and occultism. It was not until several decades after Newton's death that experiments of stoichiometry under the pioneering works of Antoine Lavoisier were conducted, and analytical chemistry, with its associated nomenclature, came to resemble modern chemistry as we know it today. However, Newton's contemporary and fellow Royal Society member, Robert Boyle, had already discovered the basic concepts of modern chemistry and began establishing modern norms of experimental practice and communication in chemistry, information which Newton did not use.

Much of Newton's writing on alchemy may have been lost in a fire in his laboratory, so the true extent of his work in this area may have been larger than is currently known. Newton also suffered a nervous breakdown during his period of alchemical work.

Newton's writings suggest that one of the main goals of his alchemy may have been the discovery of the philosopher's stone (a material believed to turn base metals into gold), and perhaps to a lesser extent, the discovery of the highly coveted Elixir of Life. Newton reportedly believed that a Diana's Tree, an alchemical demonstration producing a dendritic "growth" of silver from solution, was evidence that metals "possessed a sort of life."

Some practices of alchemy were banned in England during Newton's lifetime, due in part to unscrupulous practitioners who would often promise wealthy benefactors unrealistic results in an attempt to swindle them. The English Crown, also fearing the potential devaluation of gold because of the creation of fake gold, made penalties for alchemy very severe. In some cases the punishment for unsanctioned alchemy would include the public hanging of an offender on a gilded scaffold while adorned with tinsel and other unspecified items.

He needed to be discreet about alchemy since alchemy was a vector of heretical ideas and mobs were lynching heretics and alchemy provided technical knowledge about counterfeiting money. So, alchemy was considered dangerous.

Newton believed that metals vegetate, that the whole cosmos/matter is alive and that gravity is caused by emissions of an alchemical principle he called salniter.

Since the 1950s, the question of the nature and degree of influence of alchemy on Newton's main works, "Mathematical Principles of Natural Philosophy" and "Optics" has been actively discussed. At present, the understanding that there is a connection between the alchemical and natural science views of Newton has become generally accepted. Some historians of science express an opinion on the decisive nature of the influence of alchemy, occultism and hermetism on the theory of forces and gravity. A discussion of Newton's alchemical studies had a significant impact on the understanding of the scientific revolution.

Writings
Due to the threat of punishment and the potential scrutiny he feared from his peers within the scientific community, Newton may have deliberately left his work on alchemical subjects unpublished. Newton was well known as being highly sensitive to criticism, such as the numerous instances when he was criticized by Robert Hooke, and his admitted reluctance to publish any substantial information regarding calculus before 1693. A perfectionist by nature, Newton also refrained from publication of material that he felt was incomplete, as evident from a 38-year gap from Newton's conception of calculus in 1666 and its final full publication in 1704, which would ultimately lead to the infamous Leibniz–Newton calculus controversy.

Most of the scientist's manuscript heritage after his death passed to John Conduitt, the husband of his niece Catherine. To evaluate the manuscripts, physician Thomas Pellet was involved, who decided that only "the Chronology of Ancient Kingdoms", an unreleased fragment of "Principia", "Observations upon the Prophesies of Daniel and the Apocalypse of St. John" and "Paradoxical Questions Concerning the Morals and Actions of Athanasius and His Followers" were suitable for publication. The remaining manuscripts, according to Pellet, were "foul draughts of the Prophetic stile" and were not suitable for publication. After the death of J. Conduitt in 1737, manuscripts were transferred to Catherine, who unsuccessfully tried to publish theological notes of her uncle. She consulted with Newton's friend, the theologian Arthur Ashley Sykes (1684–1756). Sykes kept 11 manuscripts for himself, and the rest of the archive passed into the family of Catherine's daughter, who married the John Wallop, Viscount Lymington, and was then owned by the Earls of Portsmouth. Sykes' documents after his death came to the Rev. Jeffery Ekins (d. 1791) and were kept in the family of the latter until they were presented to the New College, Oxford in 1872. Until the mid-19th century, few had access to the Portsmouth collection, including David Brewster, a renowned physicist and biographer of Newton. In 1872, the fifth Earl of Portsmouth transferred part of the manuscripts (mainly of a physical and mathematical nature) to Cambridge University.

In 1936, a collection of Isaac Newton's unpublished works were auctioned by Sotheby's on behalf of Gerard Wallop, 9th Earl of Portsmouth. Known as the "Portsmouth Papers", this material consisted of 329 lots of Newton's manuscripts, over a third of which were filled with content that appeared to be alchemical in nature. At the time of Newton's death this material was considered "unfit to publish" by Newton's estate, and consequently fell into obscurity until their somewhat sensational reemergence in 1936.

At the auction many of these documents, along with Newton's death mask, were purchased by economist John Maynard Keynes, who throughout his life collected many of Newton's alchemical writings. Much of the Keynes collection later passed to eccentric document collector Abraham Yahuda, who was himself a vigorous collector of Isaac Newton's original manuscripts.

Many of the documents collected by Keynes and Yahuda are now in the Jewish National and University Library in Jerusalem. In recent years, several projects have begun to gather, catalogue, and transcribe the fragmented collection of Newton's work on alchemical subjects and make them freely available for on-line access. Two of these are The Chymistry of Isaac Newton Project supported by the U.S. National Science Foundation, and The Newton Project supported by the U.K. Arts and Humanities Research Board. In addition, The Jewish National and University Library has published a number of high-quality scanned images of various Newton documents.

The Philosopher's Stone 
Of the material sold during the 1936 Sotheby's auction, several documents indicate an interest by Newton in the procurement or development of the philosopher's stone. Most notably are documents entitled Artephius his secret Book, followed by The Epistle of Iohn Pontanus, wherein he beareth witness of ye book of Artephius; these are themselves a collection of excerpts from another work entitled Nicholas Flammel, His Exposition of the Hieroglyphicall Figures which he caused to be painted upon an Arch in St Innocents Church-yard in Paris. Together with The secret Booke of Artephius, And the Epistle of Iohn Pontanus: Containing both the Theoricke and the Practicke of the Philosophers Stone. This work may also have been referenced by Newton in its Latin version found within Lazarus Zetzner's Theatrum Chemicum, a volume often associated with the Turba Philosophorum and other early European alchemical manuscripts. Nicolas Flamel, one subject of the aforementioned work, was a notable, though mysterious figure, often associated with the discovery of the philosopher's stone, hieroglyphical figures, early forms of tarot, and occultism. Artephius, and his "secret book", were also subjects of interest to 17th-century alchemists.

Also in the 1936 auction of Newton's collection was The Epitome of the treasure of health written by Edwardus Generosus Anglicus innominatus who lived Anno Domini 1562. This is a twenty-eight-page treatise on the philosopher's stone, the Animal or Angelicall Stone, the Prospective stone or magical stone of Moses, and the vegetable or the growing stone.  The treatise concludes with an alchemical poem.

The Principia 
Much of his research into the movement of heavenly bodies was influenced by his belief that there is a single invisible force at work in the orbits of celestial bodies.  Newton conceived of this invisible force not as occult, but as universal, unchanging, describable and predictable within the language of mathematics and natural law.

Other natural philosophers, most notably Descartes, tended to object to this notion and insisted instead that action depended on physical contact, proposing that celestial objects were moved about by a great many small particles.

The second book of the Principia has not withstood the test of time. Much of the work within this volume revolved around measuring air resistance on the motion of pendulums and spheres.  Some believe that the main corpus of this work was ultimately an effort to refute Descartes's Cartesian theory of Vortices, according to which, planetary motion was produced by whirling fluid vortices that filled interplanetary space. This motion supposedly carried the planets with them.  As a spiritual man, and as an alchemist, Newton was determined that the motion of heavenly bodies was motivated by an invisible force, that natural phenomena were motivated by forces spiritual, not merely physical.

"The Key" a.k.a. Newton's Clavis 
A fragmentary alchemical text which, in 1975, was incorrectly attributed to Newton. Its authorship was immediately questioned by Karin Figala, and in 1988 William Newman conclusively proved it to be a composition by George Starkey; this fact has been repeated in a dozen publications since, and no scholar now thinks the "Key" is Newton's.

Other works 
William R. Newman, a scholar of the history of science, has collected many of Newton's alchemical writings.

Newton's various surviving alchemical notebooks clearly show that he made no distinctions between alchemy and what we today consider science. The very same pages in which we find the recordings of his legendary optics experiments we also find various recipes culled from arcane sources. "Alongside sober explanations of optical and physical phenomena such as freezing and boiling," Newman says, "we find 'Neptune's Trident', 'Mercury's Caducean Rod' and the 'Green Lion', all symbolising alchemical substances."

Determining that many of Newton's acclaimed scientific discoveries were influenced by his research of the occult and obscure has not been the simplest of tasks.  Newton did not always record his chemical experiments in the most transparent way. Alchemists were notorious for veiling their writings in impenetrable jargon, and Newton made matters even worse by inventing symbols and systems of his own. That is part of the reason why, despite Newton's reputation, many of his manuscripts have still not been properly edited and interpreted. "They are in a state of considerable disorder," Newman says.

Even where the text can be deciphered this only gets you so far. "Although we can make educated guesses about his chymical work from reading," Newman says, "there are often too many variables in chemical research to make it possible to predict an exact outcome from Newton's notes." So Newman and his colleagues set out to repeat the experiments Newton described – using exactly the same conditions.

Biblical studies 
In a manuscript from 1704, Newton describes his attempts to extract scientific information from the Bible and estimates that the world would end no earlier than 2060. In predicting this, he said, "This I mention not to assert when the time of the end shall be, but to put a stop to the rash conjectures of fanciful men who are frequently predicting the time of the end, and by doing so bring the sacred prophesies into discredit as often as their predictions fail."

Newton's studies of the Temple of Solomon 

Newton extensively studied and wrote about the Temple of Solomon, dedicating an entire chapter of The Chronology of Ancient Kingdoms Amended to his observations of the temple. Newton's primary source for information was the description of the structure given within 1 Kings of the Hebrew Bible, which he translated himself from Hebrew with the help of dictionaries, as his knowledge of that language was limited.

In addition to scripture, Newton also relied upon various ancient and contemporary sources while studying the temple.  He believed that many ancient sources were endowed with sacred wisdom and that the proportions of many of their temples were in themselves sacred. This belief would lead Newton to examine many architectural works of Hellenistic Greece, as well as Roman sources such as Vitruvius, in a search for their occult knowledge. This concept, often termed prisca sapientia (sacred wisdom and also the ancient wisdom that was revealed to Adam and Moses directly by God), was a common belief of many scholars during Newton's lifetime.

A more contemporary source for Newton's studies of the temple was Juan Bautista Villalpando, who just a few decades earlier  had published an influential manuscript entitled In Ezechielem explanationes et apparatus urbis, ac templi Hierosolymitani (1596–1605), in which Villalpando comments on the visions of the biblical prophet Ezekiel, including within this work his own interpretations and elaborate reconstructions of Solomon's Temple. In its time, Villalpando's work on the temple produced a great deal of interest throughout Europe and had a significant impact upon later architects and scholars.

As a Bible scholar, Newton was initially interested in the sacred geometry of Solomon's Temple, such as golden sections, conic sections, spirals, orthographic projection, and other harmonious constructions, but he also believed that the dimensions and proportions represented more.

Newton believed that the temple was designed by King Solomon with privileged eyes and divine guidance. To Newton, the geometry of the temple represented more than a mathematical blueprint, it also provided a time-frame chronology of Hebrew history. It was for this reason that he included a chapter devoted to the temple within The Chronology of Ancient Kingdoms Amended, a section which initially may seem unrelated to the historical nature of the book as a whole.

Newton felt that just as the writings of ancient philosophers, scholars, and biblical figures contained within them unknown sacred wisdom, the same was true of their architecture. He believed that these men had hidden their knowledge in a complex code of symbolic and mathematical language that, when deciphered, would reveal an unknown knowledge of how nature works.

In 1675 Newton annotated a copy of Manna – a disquisition of the nature of alchemy, an anonymous treatise which had been given to him by his fellow scholar Ezechiel Foxcroft. In his annotation Newton reflected upon his reasons for examining Solomon's Temple by writing:

During Newton's lifetime, there was great interest in the Temple of Solomon in Europe, due to the success of Villalpando's publications, and augmented by a vogue for detailed engravings and physical models presented in various galleries for public viewing. In 1628, Judah Leon Templo produced a model of the temple and surrounding Jerusalem, which was popular in its day. Around 1692, Gerhard Schott produced a highly detailed model of the temple for use in an opera in Hamburg composed by Christian Heinrich Postel. This immense  and  model was later sold in 1725 and was exhibited in London as early as 1723, and then later temporarily installed at the London Royal Exchange from 1729 to 1730, where it could be viewed for half-a-crown. Isaac Newton's most comprehensive work on the temple, found within The Chronology of Ancient Kingdoms Amended, was published posthumously in 1728, only adding to the public interest in the temple.

Newton's interpretations of prophecy 
Newton considered himself to be one of a select group of individuals who were specially chosen by God for the task of understanding biblical scripture. He was a strong believer in prophetic interpretation of the Bible, and like many of his contemporaries in Protestant England, he developed a strong affinity and deep admiration for the teachings and works of Joseph Mede. Although he never wrote a cohesive body of work on prophecy, Newton's belief led him to write several treatises on the subject, including an unpublished guide for prophetic interpretation entitled Rules for interpreting the words & language in Scripture. In this manuscript he details the necessary requirements for what he considered to be the proper interpretation of the Bible.

In addition, Newton would spend much of his life seeking and revealing what could be considered a Bible Code. He placed a great deal of emphasis upon the interpretation of the Book of Revelation, writing generously upon this book and authoring several manuscripts detailing his interpretations. Unlike a prophet in the true sense of the word, Newton relied upon existing Scripture to prophesy for him, believing his interpretations would set the record straight in the face of what he considered to be "so little understood". In 1754, 27 years after his death, Isaac Newton's treatise, An Historical Account of Two Notable Corruptions of Scripture would be published, and although it does not argue any prophetic meaning, it does exemplify what Newton considered to be just one popular misunderstanding of Scripture.

Although Newton's approach to these studies could not be considered a scientific approach, he did write as if his findings were the result of evidence-based research.

2060 
In late February and early March 2003, a large amount of media attention circulated around the globe regarding largely unknown and unpublished documents, evidently written by Isaac Newton, indicating that he believed the world would end no earlier than 2060. The story garnered vast amounts of public interest and found its way onto the front page of several widely distributed newspapers, including the UK's Daily Telegraph, Canada's National Post, Israel's Maariv and Yediot Aharonot, and was also featured in an article in the scientific journal Canadian Journal of History. Television and internet stories in the following weeks heightened the exposure and ultimately would include the production of several documentary films focused upon the topic of the 2060 prediction and some of Newton's lesser known beliefs and practices.

The two documents detailing this prediction are currently housed within the Jewish National and University Library in Jerusalem. Both were believed to be written toward the end of Newton's life, circa 1705, a time frame most notably established by the use of the full title of Sir Isaac Newton within portions of the documents.

These documents do not appear to have been written with the intention of publication and Newton expressed a strong personal dislike for individuals who provided specific dates for the Apocalypse purely for sensational value. Furthermore, he at no time provides a specific date for the end of the world in either of these documents.

To understand the reasoning behind the 2060 prediction, an understanding of Newton's theological beliefs should be taken into account, particularly his apparent antitrinitarian beliefs and his Protestant views on the Papacy.  Both of these lay essential to his calculations, which ultimately would provide the 2060 time frame.  See Isaac Newton's religious views for more details.

The first document, part of the Yahuda collection, is a small letter slip, on the back of which is written haphazardly in Newton's hand:

The second reference to the 2060 prediction can be found in a folio, in which Newton writes:

Clearly Newton's mathematical prediction of the end of the world is one derived from his interpretation of not only scripture, but also one based upon his theological viewpoint regarding specific chronological dates and events as he saw them.

Newton may not have been referring to the post 2060 event as a destructive act resulting in the annihilation of the globe and its inhabitants, but rather one in which he believed the world, as he saw it, was to be replaced with a new one based upon a transition to an era of divinely inspired peace. In Christian and Islamic theology this concept is often referred to as The Second Coming of Jesus Christ and the establishment of The Kingdom of God on Earth.  In a separate manuscript, Isaac Newton paraphrases Revelation 21 and 22 and relates the post 2060 events by writing:

2016 
For Newton's view of 2016 according to his contemporaries, see Religious views of Isaac Newton.

Newton's chronology 
Isaac Newton wrote extensively upon the historical topic of chronology. In 1728 The Chronology of Ancient Kingdoms Amended, an approximately 87,000-word composition that details the rise and history of various ancient kingdoms was published. The publication date of this work occurred after his death, although the majority of it had been reviewed for publication by Newton himself shortly before he died. As such, this work represents one of his last known personally reviewed publications. Sometime around 1701 he also produced a thirty page unpublished treatise entitled "The Original of Monarchies" detailing the rise of several monarchs throughout antiquity and tracing them back to the biblical figure of Noah.

Newton's chronological writing is Eurocentric, with the earliest records focusing upon Greece, Anatolia, Egypt, and the Levant. Many of Newton's dates do not correlate with current historical knowledge. While Newton mentions several pre-historical events found within the Bible, the oldest actual historical date he provides is 1125 BC. In this entry he mentions Mephres, a ruler over Upper Egypt from the territories of Syene to Heliopolis, and his successor Misphragmuthosis. However, during 1125 BC the Pharaoh of Egypt is now understood to be Ramesses IX.

Although some of the dates Newton provides for various events are accurate by 17th century standards, archaeology as a form of modern science did not exist in Newton's time. In fact, the majority of the conclusionary dates which Newton cites are based on the works of Herodotus, Pliny, Plutarch, Homer, and various other classical historians, authors, and poets; themselves often citing secondary sources and oral records of uncertain date. Newton's approach to chronology was focused upon gathering historical information from various sources found throughout antiquity and cataloguing them according to their appropriate date by his contemporary understanding, standards, and available source material.

Newton's Atlantis 
Found within The Chronology of Ancient Kingdoms Amended, are several passages that directly mention the land of Atlantis. The first such passage is part of his Short Chronicle which indicates his belief that Homer's Ulysses left the island of Ogygia in 896 BC. In Greek mythology, Ogygia was home to Calypso, the daughter of Atlas (after whom Atlantis was named). Some scholars have suggested that Ogygia and Atlantis are locationally connected, or possibly the same island. From his writings it appears Newton may have shared this belief. Newton also lists Cadis or Cales as possible candidates for Ogygia, though does not cite his reasons for believing so.

Newton and secret societies 
Isaac Newton has often been associated with various secret societies and fraternal orders throughout history.  Due to the secretive nature of such organizations, lack of supportive publicized material, and dubious motives for claiming Newton's participation in these groups, it is difficult to establish his actual membership in any specific organization, even considering there are supposedly a number of masonic buildings that have been dedicated in his honour.

Regardless of his own membership status, Newton was a known associate of many individuals who themselves have often been labeled as members of various esoteric groups. It is unclear if these associations were a result of his being a well established and prominently publicized scholar, an early member and sitting President of the Royal Society (1703–1727), a prominent figure of State and Master of the Mint, a recognized Knight, or if Newton actually sought active membership within these esoteric organizations himself.  Considering the nature and legality of alchemical practices during his lifetime, as well as his possession of various materials and manuscripts pertaining to alchemical research, Newton may very well have been a member of a group of like minded thinkers and colleagues. The organized level of this group (if in fact any existed), the level of their secrecy, as well as the depth of Newton's involvement within them, remains unclear.

Although Newton was largely considered a reclusive personality and not prone to socializing, during his lifetime being a member of "Societies" or "Clubs" was a very popular form of interpersonal networking. Considering his esteemed social status, it is probable that Newton would have had at least some contact with such groups at various levels. He was most certainly a member of The Royal Society of London for the Improvement of Natural Knowledge and the Spalding Gentlemen's Society, however, these are considered learned societies, not esoteric societies. Newton's membership status within any particular secret society remains verifiably allusive and largely speculative, however, it still lends itself to popular sensationalism.

Newton and the Rosicrucians 
Perhaps the movement which most influenced Isaac Newton was Rosicrucianism. Although the Rosicrucian movement had caused a great deal of excitement within Europe's scholarly community during the early seventeenth century, by the time Newton had reached maturity the movement had become less sensationalized. However, the Rosicrucian movement still would have a profound influence upon Newton, particularly in regard to his alchemical work and philosophical thought.

The Rosicrucian belief in being specially chosen for the ability to communicate with angels or spirits is echoed in Newton's prophetic beliefs. Additionally, the Rosicrucians proclaimed to have the ability to live forever through the use of the elixir vitae and the ability to produce limitless amounts of time and gold from the use of the philosopher's stone, which they claimed to have in their possession. Like Newton, the Rosicrucians were deeply religious, avowedly Christian, anti-Catholic, and highly politicised. Isaac Newton would have a deep interest in not just their alchemical pursuits, but also their belief in esoteric truths of the ancient past and the belief in enlightened individuals with the ability to gain insight into nature, the physical universe, and the spiritual realm.

At the time of his death, Isaac Newton had 169 books on the topic of alchemy in his personal library, and was believed to have considerably more books on this topic during his Cambridge years, though he may have sold them before moving to London in 1696. For its time, his was considered one of the finest alchemical libraries in the world. In his library, Newton left behind a heavily annotated personal copy of The Fame and Confession of the Fraternity R.C., by Thomas Vaughan which represents an English translation of The Rosicrucian Manifestos. Newton also possessed copies of Themis Aurea and Symbola Aurea Mensae Duodecium by the learned alchemist Michael Maier, both of which are significant early books about the Rosicrucian movement. These books were also extensively annotated by Newton.

Newton's ownership of these materials by no means denotes membership within any early Rosicrucian order. Furthermore, considering that his personal alchemical investigations were focused upon discovering materials which the Rosicrucians professed to already be in possession of long before he was born, would seem to some to exclude Newton from their membership. However, in religious terms, the fact that a saint might have 'found God' would not preclude others from the search – quite the opposite. During his own life, Newton was openly accused of being a Rosicrucian, as were many members of The Royal Society. Although it is not known for sure if Isaac Newton was in fact a Rosicrucian, and he never publicly identified himself as one, from his writings it does appear that he may have shared many of their sentiments and beliefs.

References

Further reading
 Dobbs, Betty Jo Teeter. The foundations of Newton's alchemy (Cambridge UP, 1983).
  Iliffe, Rob.  Priest of Nature: The Religious Worlds of Isaac Newton (Oxford UP, 2017), 536 pp. online review
 Principe, Lawrence M. "Reflections on Newton's alchemy in light of the new historiography of alchemy." in J.E. Force and S Hutton, eds. Newton and Newtonianism (Springer, 2004) pp. 205–219. online
 White, Michael. Isaac Newton: The Last Sorcerer (1997).

External links 
 
 
 An archive of Newton's texts.

Writings by Isaac Newton 
  (Biblical interpretation, the architecture of the Jewish Temple, ancient history, alchemy and the Apocalypse).

Writings about Newton 
 
 
 
 
 
 
 
 

Occult
Alchemy
Hermeticism
Occult